Maurice Joshua (born in Chicago, Illinois), usually credited under the name Maurice, is an American record producer. His single "This Is Acid (A New Dance Craze)" (1988), reached number one on the Billboard Hot Dance Club Play chart in April 1989 and stayed there for two weeks. Though that was his only hit single, he has been nominated for three Grammy Awards for remixes, and his remix of Beyoncé's "Crazy in Love", known as "Krazy in Luv" (Maurice's Nu Soul Mix), won the Grammy Award for Best Remixed Recording, Non-Classical for 2003.

References

American DJs
American house musicians
Businesspeople from Chicago
DJs from Chicago
Remixers
A&M Records artists
Grammy Award winners
Living people
Electronic dance music DJs
Year of birth missing (living people)